Tommy Tait may refer to:

Tommy Tait (socialist) 
Tommy Tait (footballer, born 1879) (1879–1942), Scottish international footballer (Sunderland)
Tommy Tait (footballer, born 1908) (1908–1976), English footballer (Sunderland, Hetton, Middlesbrough, Southport, Manchester City)

See also
Thomas Tait (disambiguation)
Tommy Tate (born 1956), American football coach
Tommy Tate (musician) (1945–2017), American soul singer and songwriter